A matador is the central bullfighter who must kill the bull.

Matador(s), The Matador(s), El Matador, or Los Matadores may also refer to:

Arts and entertainment

Comics
 Matador (Marvel Comics), a super-villain in the Marvel Comics universe

Film, television, and theater
 Matador (film) a 1986 film directed by Pedro Almodóvar
 The Matador, a 2005 film starring Pierce Brosnan
 The Matador (2008 film), a documentary
 Matador (American TV series), a 2014 action series
 Matador (Danish TV series), a 1978–1982 drama series
 Matador (Danish musical), a 2007 musical based on the television series
 Matador (English musical), a 1991 musical based on the story of El Cordobés

Games and toys
 Matador (cards), a top trump in some card games
 Matador (domino game)
 Matador (toy), a wooden construction set
 Matador (video game) or Brigador, a 2016 tactical game
 El Matador (video game), a 2006 third-person shooter

Literature
Matador, a 1934 novel by Marguerite Steen
 Matador series, a series of science fiction novels by Steve Perry

Music

Bands
 The Matadors (band), a 1960s Czech beat band

Albums
 Matador (Kenny Dorham album) or the title song, 1963
 Matador (Gaz Coombes album) or the title song, 2015
 Matador (Grant Green album) or the title song, 1979
 Matador: The Songs of Leonard Cohen, by Patricia O'Callaghan, 2012
 Matador, by Arms and Sleepers, 2009
 Matador, by Mickey 3D, or the title song, 2005
 Matador, by Zoroaster, 2010

Songs
 "Matador" (Akinori Nakagawa song), 2004
 "Matador" (Los Fabulosos Cadillacs song), 1994
 "Matador"/"Da Frame 2R", a single by Arctic Monkeys, 2007
 "The Matador" (Johnny Cash song), 1963
 "The Matador" (Sylvia song), 1981
 "Matador", by Acumen Nation from Transmissions from Eville, 1994
 "Matador", by Garland Jeffreys from American Boy & Girl, 1979
 "Matador", by Halford from Halford IV: Made of Metal, 2010
 "Matador", by Xmal Deutschland, 1986

Businesses and companies
 Matador (company), a Slovakia-based global tire producer
 Matador Content, an American television production company
 Matador Cooperative Farm, a defunct agricultural cooperative near Kyle, Saskatchewan, Canada
 Matador Records, an American record label
 The Matador (bar), a defunct bar in Portland, Oregon, US
 The Matador Club, a defunct country music venue in Toronto, Canada
 The Matador (restaurant), an American chain of Mexican restaurants

Military
 Matador (mine protected vehicle), an armoured mine protected vehicle produced by Paramount Group in South Africa
 MATADOR, an anti-armour missile system developed by Singapore and Israel
 AEC Matador, a military vehicle used by the Allies during World War II
 AV-8S Matador, Spanish version of the AV-8A Harrier
 MGM-1 Matador, one of the first cruise missiles ever introduced
 Operation Matador (disambiguation), the name of several military or intelligence plans

People with the stage name or nickname
 Matador (WA BMG 44), Senegalese hip hop musician
 Edinson Cavani (born 1987), Uruguayan football player
 Lloyd Daley (1939–2018), Jamaican reggae producer
 Luis Hernández (footballer, born 1968), Mexican football player
 Marcelo Salas (born 1974), Chilean football player
 Tito Santana (born 1953), American professional wrestler
 Primo & Epico or "Los Matadores", a professional wrestling tag team

Places
 Matador, Texas, US
 Matador Mountain, Antarctica

Sports
 Cal State Northridge Matadors, the sports teams of California State University, Northridge
 Carinthian Matadors Rugby Football Club, a defunct Austrian rugby union club
 FK Matador Púchov, a Slovak football club, sponsored by the tyre producer

Transportation
 AMC Matador, an automobile manufactured by American Motors Corporation from 1971 to 1978
 Dodge Matador, an automobile model marketed during 1960
 El Matador (custom car), a show car built by Bill Cushenbery 1959–1961
 Tempo Matador, a diesel light commercial vehicle produced by Force Motors in India

Other uses
 Matador (cocktail), a tequila-based cocktail
 Avid Matador, a 1990s 2D painting software on Silicon Graphics computers